Courtney Ann Hope (born August 15, 1989) is an American actress. She is known for her roles as Beth Wilder in the video game Quantum Break, Jesse Faden in the video game series Control and Sally Spectra on the CBS daytime soap opera The Bold and the Beautiful (2017–2020) and The Young and the Restless (2020–present). Hope received a BAFTA Award for Performer in a Leading Role nomination for her performance in Control.

Career

Acting career

The Bold and the Beautiful

In January 2017, Hope joined the CBS daytime drama The Bold and the Beautiful as Sally Spectra, the grandniece of the original character played by Darlene Conley. Her first episode debut was on January 31, 2017. Hope's character was used to recreate previous iconic storylines between the original Sally Spectra (Darlene Conley) and Stephanie Forrester (Susan Flannery). Storylines included a personal and business rivalry with Steffy Forrester (Jacqueline MacInnes Wood) temporary relationships with Liam Spencer (Scott Clifton), Thomas Forrester (Pierson Fodé) and reviving the Spectra Fashion business which lead to the introduction of new characters such as Shirley Spectra (Patrika Darbo), Sally's grand mother and sister to the original Sally. Coco Spectra (Courtney Grosbeck) Sally's sister, Saul Feinburg (Alex Wyse) a tailor for Spectra Fashions and her assistant Darlita (Danube Hermosillo). The storylines would also reintroduce C.J. Garrison (Mick Cain). These characters including Hope's would eventually leave the show in 2018 due to no further storylines involving Spectra Fashions. Hope made her final appearance on April 5, 2018 but rejoined the cast a few month later with new storyline involving Wyatt Spencer (Darin Brooks) a new career at Forrester Creations and a rivalry with Flo Fluton (Katrina Bowden). In August 2020, Hope announced that she has been let go from the series, making her last appearance on August 5, 2020.

In June 2021, Hope was nominated for a 2021 Daytime Emmy Award for Outstanding Supporting Actress in a Drama Series for her work as Sally Spectra on The Bold and the Beautiful.

The Young and the Restless

In October 2020, it was announced that Hope joined the main cast of The Young and the Restless reprising her role as Sally Spectra. Hope made her first episode debut on November 3, 2020. Executive producer and head writer Josh Griffith reintroduced the character with new storylines including Sally getting a new job at Jabot, recurring feuds with Summer Newman (Hunter King) and Phyllis Summers (Michelle Stafford), conspiring with Tara Locke (Elizabeth Leiner) and romances with Jack Abbott (Peter Bergman) and Adam Newman (Mark Grossman). When asked how all this started, Hope said it was a "definite collaborative meeting" with Griffith and the writers, saying, "They want to make sure the history is accurate and to make sure what has already happened is brought into the script when it’s necessary to make sure that there is consistency. I definitely want to honor where they take Sally."

Personal life

In 2016, Hope began dating General Hospital star, Chad Duell. The duo became engaged on Valentine's Day 2021. They were married on October 23, 2021. On December 14, 2021, it was announced the couple had split. In January 2022, Duell revealed neither he nor Hope had "signed anything" and stated they were not "married or anything."

Outside of acting, Hope is also a fitness instructor.

Filmography

Films

Television

Video games

References

External links
 Courtney Hope on IMDB/
 CBS Profile/

Living people
1989 births
American actresses
21st-century American women